Bovar Mohammed Karim (born 4 May 1984) is a Swedish footballer.

Early life
Bovar Karim was born in Paris to a Kurdish family and is a son of Sulaymaniya FC's former player Mohammed Karim.

References

External links

1984 births
Living people
Footballers from Paris
Swedish footballers
Malmö FF players
Feyenoord players
SC Cambuur players
Tromsø IL players
Randaberg IL players
IF Limhamn Bunkeflo (men) players
Eerste Divisie players
Eliteserien players
Swedish expatriate footballers
Swedish expatriate sportspeople in the Netherlands
Expatriate footballers in the Netherlands
Expatriate footballers in Norway
Swedish expatriate sportspeople in Norway
Iraqi emigrants to Sweden
Iraqi Kurdish people
Swedish people of Kurdish descent
Iraqi expatriate footballers
Iraqi footballers
Kurdish sportspeople
Sweden youth international footballers
KSF Prespa Birlik players
IFK Malmö Fotboll players
Association football midfielders
Association football forwards
BW 90 IF players